Lalit Bhati (1959 – 4 November 2020) was an Indian politician who served as a State minister in Rajasthan government and as a senior leader in the Indian National Congress. He was assigned the post of General Secretary in the State Congress Committee and was considered close to Chief Minister Ashok Gehlot.

Mr. Bhati emphasised on Library Legislation and the importance of libraries at grassroot level of the society.

Early life 
He was born in Koli family in 1959. His father was Shankar Singh Bhati, a businessperson from Ajmer city in Rajasthan, India.

Death 
Lalit Bhati died on 4 November 2020 from causes related to COVID-19. He was admitted to Jawaharlal Nehru Hospital in Ajmer on 3 November after having difficulty breathing and died the following night.

References 

1959 births
2020 deaths
20th-century Indian politicians
21st-century Indian politicians
Nationalist Congress Party politicians
Indian National Congress politicians from Rajasthan
Members of the Rajasthan Legislative Assembly
Union ministers of state of India
People from Ajmer district
Deaths from the COVID-19 pandemic in India